William Williamson (October 7, 1875 – July 15, 1972)  was an American teacher, a lawyer, a and judge who served as a U.S. Representative from South Dakota from 1921 to 1933.  He was the last  U.S. Representative from the third district of South Dakota.

Biography

William Williamson was born near New Sharon in Mahaska County, Iowa to the Norwegian immigrants Vilum Vilumson Halleland and Maren Ingebretsdatter Erland, who had left their homeplace in Skjold near Haugesund in 1872. As an adult, William Williamson did comprehend, but was not a fluent speaker of Norwegian. In 1882, he moved with his parents to Plankinton, Aurora County, South Dakota. He married Clara Victoria Dice, a German-American.

Education

He attended public school for his elementary education.  In 1903 he graduated from the University of South Dakota at Vermillion and then in 1905 from the University of South Dakota School of Law.

Career

He did not take the bar exam as he was admitted to the bar in 1905 under diploma privilege.  He began his law practice in Oacoma, South Dakota in Lyman County in that same year.  He was a co-founder (along with his brother) of Murdo Coyote and the Prairie Sun.

From 1905 to 1911 he was prosecuting attorney of Lyman County. From 1911 until 1921 he served as court circuit judge for the 11th judicial district  From March 1921 to March 1933 he was elected as a Republican to Congress (five succeeding terms).  In 1912 he was a delegate to the Republican National Convention and served as Chairman on the Committee on Expenditures in the Department of the Interior for the 68th and 69th Congresses; and Committee on Expenditures in Executive Departments for the 70th and 71st Congresses;

Post political career
He resumed his law practice in Rapid City, and was special assistant attorney general of South Dakota also being assigned as general counsel for the Public Utilities Commission 1939–1951.   He also served the Department of Insurance of South Dakota.

During the years of 1929 to 1972 he was a member of the Mount Rushmore National Memorial Commission.

Death
He died on July 15, 1972 in Custer, South Dakota.  He is buried in Pine Lawn Cemetery, Rapid City, South Dakota.

References

External links

William Williamson's biography
William Williamson Papers at Special Collections and Archives at The University of South Dakota, Vermillion

1875 births
1972 deaths
People from Mahaska County, Iowa
People from Aurora County, South Dakota
Republican Party members of the United States House of Representatives from South Dakota